Great Wymondley is a village and former civil parish situated near Hitchin, now in the parish of Wymondley, in the North Hertfordshire district, in the county of Hertfordshire, England. Despite the names, Great Wymondley is a smaller settlement than its neighbour, Little Wymondley. In 1931 the parish had a population of 285.

Landscape
The village is set in an agricultural landscape which is protected within the Green Belt. The soil is boulder clay above chalk.

Field system
In the late 19th century the historian Frederic Seebohm, who lived in Hitchin, studied the layout of local villages, including Wymondley's field system. In publications such as The English Village Community (1883), he looked at continuity between Roman and English villages.
Seebohm was aware that there was a Roman road east of Wymondley, passing through Graveley on the way to Baldock. He was also aware of research that had been done on the work of Roman land surveyors (known as gromatici) elsewhere in the Roman Empire. As well as aligning roads, Roman land surveyors were involved in organising field boundaries.

Seebohm argued that Wymondley's open field system, as recorded on detailed manorial maps, incorporated old boundaries and in particular fossilised Roman boundaries. He suggested that the dimensions of the fields to the west of the Roman road reflect the use of an ancient unit of measurement called the jugerum. Assuming the validity of this analysis, which according to Michael Wood has been confirmed at least in part by later scholars,one implication is that there was continuity in the way the land was managed before and after the Anglo-Saxon settlement of this part of Hertfordshire. Toponyms also supply some evidence for continuity, for example the village of Wallington near Baldock appears to have been named by the Anglo-Saxons after its Romano-British population.

History
Wymondley appears in the Domesday Book with a recorded population of 58 households.  This figure does not distinguish between Great and Little Wymondley, but scholars have been able to derive data about the separate villages from the Domesday record.

Great Wymondley was a separate civil parish until 1 April 1937, when it merged with neighbouring Little Wymondley to form a single parish called Wymondley.

Buildings

Ruins
There are two scheduled monuments in the parish:
Wymondley Roman Villa. The remains are situated near Ninesprings in the valley of the River Purwell. It has been partly excavated.
Great Wymondley Castle. The earthworks of a motte-and-bailey castle and associated manorial enclosure 20m east of St Mary's Church.

Extant buildings
The Church of St Mary the Virgin is Grade I listed. It has a Norman nave and chancel, the latter being an apse built of small rounded stones. 

Delamere House is an elegant Elizabethan building. There are also a number of thatched cottages, including a row of terraced cottages each named after one of King Henry VIII's wives.

See also
 Centuriation

References

Further reading
Parishes: Great or Much Wymondley, in A History of the County of Hertford: Volume 3, ed. William Page (London, 1912), pp. 181–185 http://www.british-history.ac.uk/vch/herts/vol3/pp181-185.

External links

Villages in Hertfordshire
Roman sites in Hertfordshire
Former civil parishes in Hertfordshire
North Hertfordshire District